Garmab-e Bala (also Romanized as Garmāb-e Bālā and Garmāb Bālā) is a village in Kharturan Rural District, Beyarjomand District, Shahrud County, Semnan Province, Iran. At the 2006 census, its population was 39, in 8 families.

References 

Populated places in Shahrud County